Sotará is a stratovolcano located in Sotará, Cauca, Colombia. The volcano is located between the Silvia-Pijao Fault in the west and the San Jerónimo Fault in the east.

Gallery

See also 
 Geology of Colombia
 List of volcanoes in Colombia
 List of volcanoes by elevation

References

Bibliography

External links 

 

Mountains of Colombia
Stratovolcanoes of Colombia
Andean Volcanic Belt
Geography of Cauca Department
Four-thousanders of the Andes